The Medical Defence Union (MDU) is the third largest medical defence organisation (MDO) in the United Kingdom, offering professional medical indemnity for clinical negligence claims and advice provided by medico-legal experts for its members.  A mutual not for profit organisation that guides, supports and defends medical & dental professionals in the UK. Led and staffed by doctors and dentists with real-life experience of the challenges faced by healthcare professionals.

The MDU was established in 1885 and was the first of its kind in the world.  it has around 200,000 members: doctors, nurses, dentists and other healthcare professionals. The Dental Defence Union (DDU) is the specialist dental division of the MDU.

History
The Medical Defence Union was founded in 1885 following outrage in the medical community over the case of a Dr David Bradley who was wrongly convicted of a charge of assaulting a woman in his surgery. Dr Bradley spent eight months in prison before receiving a full pardon.

By late 1885, there was increasing recognition among the medical profession of the real risk doctors ran in their everyday practice and the poor resources at their disposal to defend themselves. The British Medical Association, for example, to which many of the profession belonged, was not permitted under its constitution to undertake individual medical defence.

In 1885, solicitors Mr Dauney and Mr Cridland, together with Mr Rideal, Mr Clements, Mr Leggatt, Mr Sinyanki and Mr Fitzgerald, signed a memorandum that established the aims and objectives of the newly registered company, the Medical Defence Union. They were the first executive board. The annual subscription cost for members was set at 10 shillings.

Services
The MDU produces a member guide, to explain to memberswhat they might expect:
 Professional indemnity against claims for clinical negligence
 Support and representation with disciplinary and regulatory investigations, coroner’s inquests and criminal investigations into members’ professional practice
 Medico-legal advice including out of hours emergency helpline 24 hours a day
 Help with responding to patient complaints
 Support when faced with media attention such as help with preparing media statements and responding to the media
 Risk management resources from case reports and online journals 
 CPD-accredited education courses helping members reduce the risk of a complaint or claim, and improve their wellbeing and communication skills
 Free access to member app containing latest news, membership card and proof of membership
 Member discounts on books, courses, online revision resources

Journals
The MDU produces three journals for members which are available on its website and in its member app – the MDU journal, the DDU journal and Student Notes.

Lobbying
The MDU is active in influencing the medico-legal climate on behalf of members. 
In 2012 the MDU launched its campaign calling on the government to make compensation for injured patients fair and affordable. The campaign was launched in response to spiralling medical negligence bills which have quadrupled in the last decade.   According to former chief executive, Dr Christine Tomkins, compensation claims in England are among the highest in the world and the consequence of this on general practice and the wider NHS is catastrophic.
MDU also campaigned for state-backed indemnity for GPs in England which was introduced in April 2019 and they have called for healthcare professionals to be exempt from litigation related to the COVID-19 pandemic.

Regulatory and legal information
The Medical Defence Union is authorised and regulated by the Financial Conduct Authority for insurance mediation and consumer credit activities only. The MDU is not an insurance company. The benefits of MDU membership are all discretionary and are subject to the Memorandum and Articles of Association.

References

External links
 

1885 establishments in the United Kingdom
Organizations established in 1885
Medical associations based in the United Kingdom